Olios senilis, is a species of spider of the genus Olios. It is native to India and Sri Lanka.

See also
 List of Sparassidae species

References

Sparassidae
Endemic fauna of India
Spiders of Asia
Spiders described in 1880